Apple Beer is a non-alcoholic American brand of the German drink fassbrause, produced by The Apple Beer Corporation in Salt Lake City. Apple Beer is primarily distributed to the Western and Mountain regions of the United States and in the Caribbean.

History
Apple Beer was first produced in the 1960s from the fassbrause formula of Scholvien & Co. (now WILD Flavors). Although originally only available in cans, Apple Beer is now also available in glass bottles and in soda fountains.

Ingredients

Apple Beer is made of carbonated water, sugar, citric acid, natural flavors, and vitamin C.

See also
 Cider
 List of brand name soft drinks products
 List of soft drink flavors

Notes

External links
 

Apple sodas
Utah cuisine